Leisuretowne is an unincorporated community and census-designated place (CDP) located within Southampton Township, in Burlington County, New Jersey, United States. As of the 2010 United States Census, the CDP's population was 3,582.

Leisuretowne is a retirement village, with a standing rule of having prospective residents reach the age of 55 before purchasing a home. Two thirds of the CDPs residents are 65 years of age or older.

Geography
According to the United States Census Bureau, Leisuretowne had a total area of 2.043 square miles (5.291 km2), including 1.915 square miles (4.960 km2) of land and 0.128 square miles (0.331 km2) of water (6.25%).

Demographics

Census 2010

Census 2000
As of the 2000 United States Census there were 2,535 people, 1,628 households, and 817 families living in the CDP. The population density was 546.8/km2 (1,419.5/mi2). There were 1,709 housing units at an average density of 368.6/km2 (957.0/mi2). The racial makeup of the CDP was 98.46% White, 1.07% African American, 0.08% Native American, 0.12% Asian, and 0.28% from two or more races. Hispanic or Latino of any race were 0.75% of the population.

There were 1,628 households, out of which 0.2% had children under the age of 18 living with them, 45.8% were married couples living together, 3.5% had a female householder with no husband present, and 49.8% were non-families. 47.6% of all households were made up of individuals, and 42.4% had someone living alone who was 65 years of age or older. The average household size was 1.56 and the average family size was 2.07.

In the CDP the population was spread out, with 0.2% under the age of 18, 0.4% from 18 to 24, 1.9% from 25 to 44, 17.9% from 45 to 64, and 79.6% who were 65 years of age or older. The median age was 74 years. For every 100 females, there were 67.0 males. For every 100 females age 18 and over, there were 67.0 males.

The median income for a household in the CDP was $30,020, and the median income for a family was $36,526. Males had a median income of $42,143 versus $32,969 for females. The per capita income for the CDP was $27,581. None of the families and 2.5% of the population were living below the poverty line, including no under eighteens and 2.2% of those over 64.

References

External links
 LeisureTowne website

Census-designated places in Burlington County, New Jersey
Populated places in the Pine Barrens (New Jersey)
Southampton Township, New Jersey